Marriage in Pakistan pertains to wedding traditions established and adhered by Pakistani men and women. Despite their local and regional variations, marriages in Pakistan generally follow Islamic marital jurisprudence., they are very similar to north Indian weddings traditionally and culturally. Socially, marriages are not only seen as a union between a husband and a wife, but also an alliance between their respective families. These traditions extend to other countries around in the world where Overseas Pakistani communities exist.

Before the wedding

Search
Searching for a potential groom or bride is the first step of traditional Pakistani marriages. Beyond age 20, both men and women are considered potential grooms and brides. Most marriages in Pakistan are traditional arranged marriages, semi-arranged marriages or love marriages.
Arranged marriage occurs when a member of the family, a close friend or a third person party helps bring two supposedly compatible people together in matrimony. The groom and bride have usually never met before, and any interaction between them is akin to small talk with a stranger. This form of marriage is considered traditional, but is losing popularity among the newer generations.
Semi-arranged marriage is a growing trend where both men and women interact with one another before marriage (a form of dating). Both the man and woman have usually had several “meet and greet” opportunities, thereby allowing both to gain a sense of familiarity. This process can occur over a span of a few months to a few years and may or may not culminate in marriage. However, if both agree upon marriage, the potential groom will approach his family to send a proposal to the family of the potential bride.
Love marriages (also known as court marriages) are rare, since the concept of "family consent" has been eliminated. Such “free-will” challenges traditional mindsets as it "dishonours" the powerful institution in Pakistani society - the family. Without family consent, marriages are usually frowned upon.

Proposals
Once a decision has been made by either the man or woman or both, one or more representatives of the potential groom's family pay a visit to the potential bride's family. In arranged marriages, the first visit is purely for the parties to become acquainted with one another and does not include a formal proposal. Following the first visit, both the man and woman have their say in whether or not they would like a follow up to this visit. Once both parties are in agreement, a proposal party is held at the bride's home, where the groom's parents and family elders formally ask the bride's parents for her hand in marriage. In semi-arranged marriages, the first or second visit may include a formal proposal, since both the man and woman have already agreed to marriage prior - the proposal is more or less a formality. In love marriages, the man directly proposes to the woman. Once the wedding proposal is accepted, beverages and refreshments are served. Depending on individual family traditions, the bride-to-be may also be presented with gifts such as jewelry and a variety of gifts. Some religious families may also recite Surah Al-Fatihah.

Engagement
An engagement (called nisbat , mangni  or habar bandi ) is a formal ceremony to mark the engagement of the couple. It is usually a small ceremony that takes place in the presence of a few close members of the would-be bride's and groom's families. Rings and other items of jewelry among affluent families are exchanged between the would-be bride and groom. In traditional engagement ceremonies, the bride and the groom are not seated together, and the rings are placed on the bride's finger by the groom's mother or sister, and vice versa. However, segregated engagement ceremonies have become a rarity among the newer generations and rings are usually exchanged between the couple. A prayer (Dua) and blessings are then recited for the couple, and the wedding date is decided.

Wedding
A typical Pakistani wedding, or Shaadi consists of two main events - the Nikkah and Walima. Arranged and semi-arranged marriages in Pakistan often take long periods of time to finalize and up to a year or more can elapse from the day of engagement until the wedding ceremony. Wedding customs and celebrations vary upon ethnicity and religion.

Nikah

The Nikah is the formal marriage ceremony where a marriage contract, or Nikahnama, is signed by both the bride and the groom in presence of close family members. The Nikah is typically performed by a religious scholar at a mosque, such as an Imam, Mufti, Sheikh or Mullah, who in Pakistan will be licensed by the government to perform the ceremony. The bride and groom must both have two witnesses present to ensure that the marriage is consensual.

Walima

The Walima is the formal reception hosted by the husband and wife and officially makes the marriage public. It is typically a huge celebration with many relatives and as well as invited guests of both families in attendance. Traditionally, the Walima was hosted at home but nowadays are increasingly being held at marriage halls, restaurants or hotels.

Regional variations
There are considerable regional variations for weddings in Pakistan.

Baloch weddings
Baloch weddings are known to be lavish and short. In Balochi language, the groom is referred to as the Saloonk, while the bride is referred to as the Banoor. Baloch marriages often takes only one or two days to complete.

Zamati
Zamati is referred to as the marriage proposal in Balochi language. Under Baloch cultural norms, elders of the potential groom's family visit the home of the potential bride's family and make an official request for their willingness for the two to be married. In the past, the decision to accept a proposal would be made by the family elders of the potential bride. Nowadays, the potential bride is asked if she would be interested in accepting the proposal. Once accepted, the would-be bride is presented with a decorated red scarf and gifts.

Habar Bandi
Habar Bandi is referred to as the engagement in Balochi language. Habar translates into decision, while bandi translates into union. This period is very important part of Baloch wedding, as legal obligations are fixed.

Bijjar
Bijjar is referred to as cooperation in Balochi language. In actuality, this is the receiving of contributions, whereby the groom (saloonk) or his family members receive financial help from community members (mainly relatives and friends) to smoothly perform the wedding and initial months of the newly weds. Bijjar usually came in the form of cattle or crops but nowadays is mainly money, which is repaid back at weddings of relatives and friends at a later time.

Lotokhi
Lotokhi is referred to as invitation in Balochi language. Women from both families are given this task to write up a list of all those invited. Later, this list is used to note down the gifts that were given by each invitee. Later, the debt is repaid at future weddings or events.

Jol Bandi
Jol Bandi is a Baloch wedding ceremony which marks the beginning of the wedding ceremony. It is normally held at the bride's home, and is similar in concept to Rasm-e-Heena. "Jol" translates into large well decorated cloth, while "bandi" in this case means to tie together. During this ceremony, the bride is covered with the decorated cloth, usually sown by the groom's family.

Dozokhi & Henna Bandi
Dozokhi and Heena Bandi is a Baloch wedding ceremony whereby heena is applied onto the bride's hands. It is often the most energetic part of the wedding, whereby friends and family members put money in a plate above the head of the bride, called Leth. As evening approaches, the mahfil and khorag occurs.

Mahfil & Khorag
Mahfil is referred to as gathering in Baloch language, while Khorag is referred to as food. During the gathering, the traditional Baloch dance called Chaap is performed by the men.

Jannh
Jannh is a Baloch wedding ceremony hosted by the family of the groom.

Nikah
Same traditions as noted above.

Mobaraki
Mobaraki is a post-wedding banquet common in Baloch wedding and is hosted by the family of the bride. The entire groom's family, friends and relatives are invited along with relatives and friends of the bride's family.

Walima
Same traditions as noted above.

Pashtun weddings
Pashtun weddings adhere to the customs and values of Pashtunwali. In the past, marriages were based mainly on tribal affiliations.

Wadah
‘’Wadah’’ is a Pashto term which literally refers to “promise”, but is also could mean “marriage”.

Attan
Attan is a Pashtun dance usually performed at the end of the marriage ceremonies. Traditionally however, the dance was performed twice - once at the beginning of the wedding and once at the end.

Laman Shlawal

Neewaka

Kwezhdan

Walwar

Pakha Azada

Janj

Naksha Wishtal

Nikah

Naindra

Punjabi weddings

Dholki
Dholki is a ceremony that takes its name from the percussion instrument Dholki and is featured heavily during wedding celebrations in Punjab. Traditionally, many days or even weeks before the actual wedding day, women will gather in the house of the bride at night to sing and dance while accompanied by other percussion instruments. Today, this ceremony has also been reduced to a single night of singing and is often combined with the Rasm-e-Heena ceremony.

Maklava/Bad Phera
Maklava is a predominantly a Punjabi custom. Traditionally, the marriages were arranged and often contracted between people from different cities and villages. This often meant that the bride was unfamiliar with her new family. To ease her into the new life and surroundings, she was brought back to her parents' house a few days after the wedding. She then spent some time at her parents' house before heading back to her new husband's home. This practice is still prevalent in most rural areas of the Punjab. In Northern Punjab and Kashmir, it is called Bad Phera (Exchange cycle).

Goda Pharai/Guthna Pakrai
A Punjabi custom in which the younger brother of the bridegroom holds the knee of the bride and doesn't let go until some acceptable monetary gift is given to him.

Sammi
Sammi is a folk dance mostly performed in Potohar region of upper Punjab and Hazara region of Khyber Pakhtunkhwa during weddings.

Rasm-e-Mehndi/Henna
Rasm-e-mehndi/henna or mehndi is a ceremony that is named after henna, a dye prepared from the Lawsonia inermis plant which is mixed into a paste form to apply onto the hands of the bride and groom. This event is held a few days before the main wedding ceremony and was traditionally held separately for the bride and the groom. However the ceremony is often now combined and held at a marriage hall. The groom will typically wear a casual black or white shalwar qameez, sherwani or western suit while the bride will typically wear an embroidered brightly colored shalwar kameez, sari or lehnga. The dress may or may not be accompanied by jewelry, depending upon region and ethnic background. In some ceremonies, a certain number of married women who are closely related to the bride may apply henna to her hands, and feed her sweets. This ritual is supposed to bring good luck and longevity to the bride's married life. Sometimes elaborate musical and acting performances are part of the Rasm-e-Heena celebrations, as well as competitions between the bride and groom's families are also quite common these days. Traditionally this was considered a "woman's event" as men did not participate in it. However this has changed substantially in recent generations with males featuring prominently. In some regions, Rasm-e-Heena is not celebrated while in other regions two Rasm-e-Heena celebrations are hosted, one by the groom's family and another by the bride's family.

Urdu weddings

Rasm-e-Mehndi/Henna
Rasm-e-mehndi/henna or mehndi is a ceremony that is named after henna, a dye prepared from the Lawsonia inermis plant which is mixed into a paste form to apply onto the hands of the bride and groom. This event is held a few days before the main wedding ceremony and was traditionally held separately for the bride and the groom. However the ceremony is often now combined and held at a marriage hall. The groom will typically wear a casual black or white shalwar qameez, sherwani or western suit while the bride will typically wear an embroidered brightly colored shalwar kameez, sari or lehnga. The dress may or may not be accompanied by jewelry, depending upon region and ethnic background. In some ceremonies, a certain number of married women who are closely related to the bride may apply henna to her hands, and feed her sweets. This ritual is supposed to bring good luck and longevity to the bride's married life. Sometimes elaborate musical and acting performances are part of the Rasm-e-Heena celebrations, as well as competitions between the bride and groom's families are also quite common these days. Traditionally this was considered a "woman's event" as men did not participate in it. However this has changed substantially in recent generations with males featuring prominently. In some regions, Rasm-e-Heena is not celebrated while in other regions two Rasm-e-Heena celebrations are hosted, one by the groom's family and another by the bride's family.

Rukhsati 
Rukhsati - "sending off" (sometimes called Doli - "palanquin") takes place when the groom and bride leave the shaadi venue together with the elders of the Family. Before this point the bride and groom will have already been married in the eyes of God by the imam in the nikkah. This is a Bride's farewell by her family. The games and pranks are juxtaposed with the dour occasion for the bride's parents, as the doli marks the departure of their daughter from the family unit, to establish a new home for herself. In order to bless and protect the couple, the Qur'an is held over the bride's head as she leaves, and even though there is no basis in Islam or Muslim tradition for the Rukhsati. In recent times, withholding or delaying the rukhsati has been used to exert control over the couple by the family of the bride or to extract dowry from the groom. Intentionally delaying or not hosting the Shaadi or Rukhsati May be used to disavow the relationship. However, in Islam as it is considered haram (impermissible) for any person to restrain a married woman from going with her husband, after the Nikkah has been performed

Sehra Bandi 
Garlands dressing

Seraiki weddings

Dastar Bandi
Dastar Bandi is a ceremony where a turban is placed on the head of the groom and marks the start of manhood. Elders of the groom's family place a turban on his head and formally includes him in the 'circle of men'. This ceremony is commonly performed in Khyber Pakhtunkhwa, Punjab and northern Balochistan.

Sindhi weddings

Haldi
Haldi is a Sindhi wedding ritual followed by the bride and groom - a form of purification by pouring oil and haldi all over the bride/groom bodies this is done by the family members of both. After the ceremony has finished, the couple cannot leave the house.

Paon Dhulai
Paon Dhulai is a Sindhi wedding tradition, where the bride's brother washes the feet of both of the bride and groom. Some families condemn this tradition as it is seen as an insult to the family of the bride.

Honeymoon
The honeymoon, or Shab-i-Zifaf, refers to the couple's first night together and it occurs after the bride has left for the groom's house. On the day of the wedding, the couple's bedroom is decorated with flowers. It is customary for roses or rose petals to be laid across the couple's bed and sometimes for garlands or strings of roses to be used as bed curtains. The groom's female relatives lead the bride to the bedroom and she is left for some time to await the groom's arrival. At this point it is common for the groom to stay with his relatives for a while. After the relatives have left, the groom enters the bedroom where the bride is waiting. Traditionally the bride's veil or head covering (dupatta or chador) is draped over so that it covers her face. It is customary for the husband to brush the bride's veil aside to reveal her face as one of the first things on that night. It is also customary in some families for the husband to present his newly-wed wife with a small token of affection. This is generally a ring or a family heirloom.

Gifts
It is customary for a bride and groom to receive wedding presents. Traditionally, an envelope with cash or gifts are given to the bride or groom when wedding guests come to visit them during the shaadi reception. It is also customary for friends and family of the couple to invite guests over for dinner and lunch after the shaadi to formally accept them as a couple. This can often result in the first few weeks of married life for the newly weds being spent hosting further dinner parties with the shaadi guests.

Photography

Wedding Cards

Religious customs

Mehr
Mehr is a mandatory payment, in the form of money or possessions that will be paid by the groom to the bride and stipulated in the nikkah contract. While the mehr is often money, it can also be anything agreed upon by the bride such as jewelry, home goods, furniture, a dwelling or some land. Mehr is typically specified in the marriage contract signed during an Islamic marriage. The amount of mehr is decided by the family of the bride and the time of the payment is negotiable.

See also
 Arranged marriage
 Baad (practice)
 Culture of Pakistan
 Divorce in Pakistan
 Hindu marriage laws in Pakistan
 Islamic marital jurisprudence
 Polygamy in Pakistan

References

Bibliography 
 Rasool, I.G., Zahoor, M.Y., Ahmed, I. et al. Description of novel variants in consanguineous Pakistani families affected with intellectual disability.  Genes Genom  (2022). https://doi.org/10.1007/s13258-022-01219-y

 
Pakistani culture
Pakistan
Pakistan